Cole Madison (born December 20, 1994) is an American football guard who is a free agent. He played college football at Washington State, and was drafted by the Green Bay Packers in the fifth round of the 2018 NFL Draft.

College career
Madison attended and played college football at Washington State under head coach Mike Leach from 2013 to 2017. After redshirting in 2013, he was a major contributor for the following four seasons. In 2014, he made his collegiate debut and first start in the season opener against Rutgers. In 2015, he started all 13 games at right tackle and garnered All-Pac-12 honorable mention accolades. In 2016, he started all 13 games at right tackle. He was named as an All-Pac-12 Conference honorable mention and to the All-America Second-team and All-Pac-12 First-team by Pro Football Focus. In 2017, he started all 13 games at right tackle and was named All-Pac-12 Conference Second-team and All-Pac-12 First-team by the Associated Press.

Professional career

2018 season
Madison was selected by the Green Bay Packers in the fifth round of the 2018 NFL Draft (138th overall). He signed his rookie contract on May 7, 2018. On August 13, 2018, the Packers reported that Madison was dealing with a personal issue. Madison did not participate in any games during the 2018 NFL season.

2019 season
On April 8, 2019, Madison was reinstated to the Packers active roster. Upon his return, Madison cited his mental health as the reason for this hiatus. The suicide of Madison's friend Tyler Hilinski in January 2018 is believed to be one of the reasons for his break from football.

Madison entered the 2019 season as a backup interior lineman. On November 23, 2019, he was placed on injured reserve after suffering a torn ACL in practice.

He was waived by the Packers on July 31, 2020, with a failed physical designation.

References

External links

Washington State Cougars bio

1994 births
Living people
American football offensive guards
American football offensive tackles
Green Bay Packers players
People from Burien, Washington
Players of American football from Washington (state)
Sportspeople from King County, Washington
Washington State Cougars football players